The 1965 U.S. Open was the 65th U.S. Open, held June 17–21 at Bellerive Country Club in Town and Country, Missouri, a suburb west of St. Louis. Gary Player of South Africa defeated Kel Nagle of Australia in an 18-hole playoff to win his only U.S. Open title. Player was the first foreign-born winner of the U.S. Open since 1927, and the win completed his career Grand Slam at age 29. It was the fourth of his nine major titles. The 1965 U.S. Open was the first U.S. Open broadcast on color television.

The quality of the young course's turf varied, with burned out or diseased areas which the USGA did not allow relief from. The field consisted of 136 professionals and 14 amateurs, with the top fifty and ties advancing after 36 holes. This was the first time that the U.S. Open was scheduled for four days, with the final round on Sunday. Previously the third and fourth rounds were both played on Saturday. The U.S. Women's Open also changed to this format, held two weeks later in early July.

Course layout

Final round and playoff
In the final round on Sunday, Player owned a three-stroke lead over Nagle with just three holes to play. But while Player double-bogeyed the par-3 16th hole, Nagle birdied the 17th. As Player reached the 18th tee, he knew he needed a birdie to win outright, as Nagle had parred the final hole for 282 (+2). Player had a  putt for birdie, but left it  short and tapped in for a 72-hole tie. In the 18-hole playoff on Monday afternoon, Player built a five-shot lead after eight holes and held on to win by three strokes, 71 to 74. He won the championship with fiberglass-shafted golf clubs.

With his win, Player joined Gene Sarazen and Ben Hogan as the only to win all four professional major championships, the career Grand Slam. Jack Nicklaus completed the feat himself the next year at the 1966 British Open. Player was also the first foreign-born winner of the U.S. Open in 38 years, since Scotland's Tommy Armour won in 1927.

Arnold Palmer missed the 36-hole cut by two strokes, the only time from 1962 to 1967 that he placed outside the top-5 at the U.S. Open. Defending champion Ken Venturi was hampered by numbed fingers and missed the cut by ten strokes.

Purse donated
The winner's share was $25,000 and both playoff participants received a $1,000 bonus, taken from the gate receipts of the Monday gallery of 6,790. Player donated his winner's share to cancer research ($5,000) and junior golf ($20,000) in the United States, fulfilling an earlier pledge to thank the people of America; his mother died of cancer when he was eight years old. Player paid his caddy $2,000 with his playoff bonus and $1,000 from his pocket.

Past champions in the field

Made the cut

Missed the cut

Source:

Round summaries

First round
Thursday, June 17, 1965

Source:

Second round
Friday, June 18, 1965

Source:

Third round
Saturday, June 19, 1965

Source:

Final round
Sunday, June 20, 1965

Scorecard

Cumulative tournament scores, relative to par

Source:

Playoff
Monday, June 21, 1965

Included in earnings is a playoff bonus of $1,000 each, from the playoff gate receipts.

Scorecard

{|class="wikitable" span = 50 style="font-size:85%;
|-
|style="background: Pink;" width=10|
|Birdie
|style="background: PaleGreen;" width=10|
|Bogey
|style="background: Green;" width=10|
|Double bogey
|}
Source:

References

External links
USGA Championship Database

U.S. Open (golf)
Golf in Missouri
U.S. Open
U.S. Open (golf)
U.S. Open
U.S. Open